Pigres, a native of Halicarnassus, either the brother or the son of the celebrated Artemisia, satrap of Caria. He is spoken of by the Suda as the author of the Margites and the Batrachomyomachia. The latter poem is also attributed to him by Plutarch and was probably his work. One of his feats was a very singular one, namely, inserting a pentameter line after each hexameter in the Iliad, thus: —

Sing, goddess, of the ruinous wrath of Achilles, son of Peleus.
Muse, for you possess the means of all wisdom.

Bode (Gesch. der Hellen. Dichtkunst. i. p. 279) believes that the Margites, though not composed by Pigres, suffered some alterations at his hands, and in that altered shape passed down to posterity. Some suppose that the iambic lines, which alternated with the hexameters in the Margites, were inserted by Pigres. He was the first poet, apparently, who introduced the iambic trimeter. (Fabric. Bibl. Graec. i. p. 519, &c.)

In Literature

Pigres is one of the many historical characters featured in Gore Vidal's novel Creation. In Vidal's depiction, Pigres was Artemisia's brother - excluded by her from succession to their father's throne, living in fear of her and taking up comic poetry as a refuge.

Notes

References
Pigres from Smith's Dictionary of Greek and Roman Biography and Mythology (1867), from which this article was originally derived
Suda On Line: Pigres

Ancient Halicarnassians
Ancient Greek epic poets
Iambic poets
5th-century BC poets